NHL Powerplay '96 is a video game developed by Radical Entertainment and published by Virgin Interactive Entertainment for the PlayStation, Sega Saturn, and Windows.

Gameplay
NHL Powerplay '96 is an NHL ice hockey video game.

Reception
Next Generation reviewed the Saturn version of the game, rating it five stars out of five, and stated that "Attempts at finding fault in Powerplay'''s design just provokes  more than substantive criticism. The small puck is sometimes hard to pick out on the ice, but then you could say that about real-life hockey. Also, the number of stats the game tracks may be less than what a die-hard hockey fan would demand. But all in all, once the puck hits the ice these minor complaints are quickly forgotten. Sony be warned: NFL Face Off was a great game, but NHL Powerplay '96 is better."

In 1996, Next Generation listed NHL Powerplay as number 40 on their "Top 100 Games of All Time", commenting that, "NHL Powerplay offers all the excitement, ferocity, precision, and strategy of the real thing without the pain."

ReviewsPC Gamer (1996 August)Electronic Gaming Monthly (PlayStation; Jul, 1996)Electronic Gaming Monthly (SEGA Saturn; May, 1996)Computer Gaming World'' (Oct, 1996)
Mean Machines - Oct, 1996
GameSpot - Sep 19, 1996
PC Player (Germany) - Aug, 1996

References

1996 video games
National Hockey League video games
PlayStation (console) games
Sega Saturn games
Video games developed in Canada
Virgin Interactive games
Windows games